The 1982–83 Boston Bruins season was the Bruins' 59th season.

Offseason

Regular season

Final standings

Schedule and results

Playoffs

Player statistics

Regular season
Scoring

Goaltending

Playoffs
Scoring

Goaltending

Awards and records

Transactions

Draft picks
The 1982 NHL Entry Draft was held on June 9, 1982, at the held at the Montreal Forum in Montreal, Quebec. The Boston Bruins held the 1st overall draft pick.

Farm teams

See also
1982–83 NHL season

References

External links

Boston Bruins seasons
Boston Bruins
Boston Bruins
Adams Division champion seasons
Boston Bruins
Boston Bruins
Bruins
Bruins